The Toronto Maple Leafs are a professional ice hockey team based in Toronto, Ontario. They are members of the Atlantic Division in the Eastern Conference of the National Hockey League (NHL) and are known as one of the Original Six teams of the league. Founded in 1917, the club had no nickname in their first season, and were known as the Toronto Arenas for their second season. From the 1919–20 season they were known as the Toronto St. Patricks, until in February 1927 when the club was purchased by Conn Smythe.  Smythe changed the name of the club to the Maple Leafs and they have been known by that name ever since. The franchise has had sixteen general managers since their inception.

Key

General managers

See also

List of NHL general managers

Notes
 A running total of the number of general managers of the franchise. Thus any general manager who has two or more separate terms as general manager is only counted once. Interim general managers do not count towards the total.
 From 1955 to 1957, Smythe turned over most of his authority over day-to-day hockey operations to Hap Day, but remained general manager on paper.

References

Toronto Maple Leafs
 
Toronto Maple Leafs general managers
general managers